Spinneys is an Arabian multinational supermarket chain active in the United Arab Emirates, Egypt, 
Qatar, Lebanon, Oman and Pakistan. It began as a railway provision merchant company, and expanded to a grocery firm importing British Empire goods to Mandate Palestine. The largest shareholder and manager of the brand is the Dubai based Al Bwardy Investment, founded by Mr. Ali Albwardy.

History 

The supermarket was founded by Arthur Rawdon Spinney (CBE), who, having served in the Staffordshire Yeomanry and later on the staff of General Allenby, set up operations in the suburbs of Alexandria, Egypt in 1924, which initially formed and organized the provision department of the Palestine Railways. He took over transporting contract to Mandate Palestine administration from two pioneering New Zealanders, Norman & Gerald Nairn, who established the first cross-desert bus service between Damascus & Baghdad following the First World War.

Setting up his import and shipping headquarters in Haifa, he later sold imported English goods from the Jaffa Road store, which were then a novelty in Mandate Palestine and Syria through his two companies Spinney's Ltd., and Full-worth Ltd., which contrasted with local merchants who only sold goods sourced from the region and were unfamiliar to the British living and serving there. His commercial position, and involvement with the Palestine Commissioner allowed him to also hold the post of a trustee for Haifa early in the Second World War. During the Second World War Rawdon Spinney also served as the Hungarian Consul General in Palestine, having moved house to Jerusalem, with two stores operated at the Spinney's (Spinney's Ltd., Haifa) Greek Colony branch, and Mamillah Road premises until 1949.

Initially Spinneys branches were located in the major regional cities frequented by British subjects via the railway line: Alexandria, Cairo, Haifa, Acre where it operated the Kabri Mineral Factory and Damascus. Since mid-1920s Haifa branch, where Spinney married Cecil Joan Glegg in 1928, and was later the President of The Haifa Rotary Club, also served as agents for Peninsular and Oriental Steam Navigation Company Traders & Shippers Ltd. Due to interruption to railway services, on which Spinneys depended, with the start of the 1936–1939 Arab revolt in Palestine it moved its Haifa branch, from Mandate Palestine to Baghdad.

Mr Spinney joined the UK establishment when his daughter Elisabeth married John Slim, 2nd Viscount Slim in 1958 in London.

In the 1960s Rawdon Spinney retired from active participation in the managing of the stores, and died in August 1973 in Littlehampton, Sussex, where he was buried in the Crematorium.

After the 14 July Revolution, its Baghdad store was relocated in 1961 to Dubai, Trucial States (Now the United Arab Emirates) where it had operated since 1942 in Al Nasr Square, Deira. In later years other stores were opened across Arab states of the Persian Gulf region. In 1948 the first Spinneys store in Beirut Souks was open.

Present 
As of 2011, the Spinneys Group Limited is a premium supermarket retailer in the Middle East, and operates hypermarkets and supermarkets in eighteen stores in Lebanon, fifteen stores in Egypt, two in Jordan, Four in Oman and Fifty Six Spinneys stores in the United Arab Emirates. In UAE, Spinneys is considered one of the few supermarket selling pork and non-halal meat.

See also

References

External links 
 

Retail companies established in 1924
Retail companies of Lebanon
Supermarkets of the United Arab Emirates
Store brands
1924 establishments in Egypt
Emirati brands
Multinational companies headquartered in the United Arab Emirates